Lonborg is a surname. Notable people with the surname include:

Jim Lonborg (born 1942), former Major League baseball player
Dutch Lonborg (1898-1985), American college basketball coach